Judge Broderick may refer to:

Raymond J. Broderick (1914–2000), judge of the United States District Court for the Eastern District of Pennsylvania
Vernon S. Broderick (born 1963), judge of the United States District Court for the Southern District of New York
Vincent L. Broderick (1920–1995), judge of the United States District Court for the Southern District of New York